Kugel–Khomskii coupling describes a coupling between the spin and orbital degrees of freedom in a solid; it is named after the Russian physicists Kliment I. Kugel (Климент Ильич Кугель) and Daniel I. Khomskii (Daniil I. Khomskii, Даниил Ильич Хомский). The Hamiltonian used is:

References
 
 

Condensed matter physics